Hanno Aleksanteri Möttölä (born 9 September 1976) is a Finnish former professional basketball player. Möttölä played for the Atlanta Hawks in the National Basketball Association (NBA), at the power forward position, where he became the first player from Finland to play in the NBA.

College career
Möttölä attended the University of Utah, in the United States, where he played college basketball under head coach Rick Majerus. He was a starter on the Utah Utes team that played in the final of the 1998 NCAA national championship tournament, which they lost to Kentucky.

Professional career
After college, Möttölä was selected in the second round, with the 40th overall pick, in the 2000 NBA draft, by the Atlanta Hawks. He played two seasons in the NBA with the Hawks. He played in all 82 games during his sophomore (and final) season. His final NBA game was on April 17th, 2002 in a 81 - 89 loss to the Boston Celtics where he recorded 1 steal and 2 rebounds. After his time with the Hawks, he returned to Europe. He played in Spain, with TAU Cerámica of the ACB, then in Italy, with Skipper Bologna (in the 2003–04 season, his team reached the Italian League finals and EuroLeague Final). He also played in Italy with Scavolini Pesaro (from 2004 to 2005).

Möttölä also played in the Russian Super League with Dynamo Moscow, in the Lithuanian LKL League with Žalgiris Kaunas, and in the Greek Basket League (GBL) with Aris, after signing with the team on 26 July 2007. 

Möttölä announced his retirement from playing basketball on 26 September 2008, but decided to return to basketball just nine months later. In September 2009, Möttölä signed with the Finnish team Torpan Pojat. He played in the team for four seasons, during which the team was the runner-up in the Finnish League championship (2009–10), in the Finnish Cup (2010–11), and finished in third-place in Finnish League (2011–12).

National team career
Möttölä was a long-time member of the senior Finnish national basketball team. With Finland, he played at the 1995 EuroBasket, the 2011 EuroBasket, the 2013 EuroBasket, and the 2014 FIBA World Cup.

Personal life
Finnish ice hockey players, Jarkko Ruutu and Tuomo Ruutu, are Möttölä's second cousins.

Career statistics

NBA

|-
| style="text-align:left;"| 2000-01
| style="text-align:left;"| Atlanta
| 72 || 3 || 13.5 || .444 || .000 || .811 || 2.4 || .3 || .2 || .1 || 4.5
|-
| style="text-align:left;"| 2001-02
| style="text-align:left;"| Atlanta
| 82 || 14 || 16.7 || .440 || .077 || .750 || 3.3 || .6 || .2 || .2 || 4.8
|- class="sortbottom"
| colspan=2 style="text-align:center;"| Career
| 154 || 17 || 15.2 || .442 || .063 || .783 || 2.9 || .5 || .2 || .2 || 4.6

EuroLeague

|-
| style="text-align:left;"| 2002–03
| style="text-align:left;"| TAU Cerámica
| 7 || 3 || 30.4 || .569 || .444 || .774 || 3.4 || 1.0 || .7 || .3 || 15.1 || 13.6
|-
| style="text-align:left;"| 2003–04
| style="text-align:left;"| Skipper Bologna
| 22 || 16 || 21.8 || .520 || .348 || .879 || 3.8 || .4 || .8 || .4 || 10.8 || 9.2
|-
| style="text-align:left;"| 2004–05
| style="text-align:left;"| Scavolini Pesaro
| 22 || 16 || 28.6 || .497 || .375 || .833 || 5.1 || .9 || 1.0 || .5 || 13.7 || 12.2
|-
| style="text-align:left;"| 2006–07
| style="text-align:left;"| Žalgiris
| 12 || 5 || 22.6 || .547 || .500 || .806 || 3.9 || 1.3 || .5 || .5 || 10.9 || 9.8
|-
| style="text-align:left;"| 2007–08
| style="text-align:left;"| Aris
| 20 || 16 || 19.7 || .488 || .459 || .824 || 2.8 || .7 || .4 || .1 || 8.0 || 6.0
|- class="sortbottom"
| colspan=2 style="text-align:center;"| Career
| 83 || 56 || 23.9 || .516 || .406 || .833 || 3.9 || .8 || .7 || .3 || 11.3 || 9.7

References

External links
FIBA Profile
FIBA Europe Profile
Euroleague Profile
Finnish League Profile

1976 births
Living people
Aris B.C. players
Atlanta Hawks draft picks
Atlanta Hawks players
BC Dynamo Moscow players
BC Žalgiris players
Finnish expatriate basketball people in Greece
Finnish expatriate basketball people in Italy
Finnish expatriate basketball people in Lithuania
Finnish expatriate basketball people in Russia
Finnish expatriate basketball people in Spain
Finnish expatriate basketball people in the United States
Finnish men's basketball players
Fortitudo Pallacanestro Bologna players
Greek Basket League players
Liga ACB players
Power forwards (basketball)
Saski Baskonia players
Sportspeople from Helsinki
Torpan Pojat players
Utah Utes men's basketball players
Victoria Libertas Pallacanestro players
2014 FIBA Basketball World Cup players